Juan David Cabal Murillo (born 8 January 2001) is a Colombian footballer who plays as a defender for Italian  club Hellas Verona.

Career

Cabal started his career with Colombian side Atlético Nacional, helping them win the 2021 Copa Colombia. In 2022, he signed for  Verona in the Italian Serie A after receiving interest from Dutch club Feyenoord.

References

External links

2001 births
Living people
Association football defenders
Atlético Nacional footballers
Colombia youth international footballers
Colombian expatriate footballers
Colombian expatriate sportspeople in Italy
Colombian footballers
Expatriate footballers in Italy
Hellas Verona F.C. players
Serie A players